The Fall Championship Stakes was an American Grade III Thoroughbred horse race held annually at Turfway Park in Florence, Kentucky. Open to horses age three and older, it was contested on Polytrack synthetic dirt. It had been part of the Breeders' Cup Challenge series from 2008 through 2010 when the distance was changed to one and one half miles (12 furlongs) with the winner automatically qualifying for the Breeders' Cup Marathon at a similar distance.

The Latonia Championship Stakes was created in 1919 by the Kentucky Jockey Club as a race for three-year-olds at the now defunct Latonia Race Track in Latonia, Kentucky. During the height of the Great Depression the race was suspended in 1934 and the racetrack closed permanently in 1939. In 1964, the race was revived by the newly built (1959) Turfway Park.

The Fall Championship was run in two divisions in 1971 and there was no race in 1972.

Distances:
  miles : 1919–1933
  miles : 1968–1987
  miles : 1964–1967, 1988–2002
 1 mile 2003–2007
  miles : 2008–2009

Records
Speed record: (at current distance of  miles)
 2:32.25 – Delightful Kiss (2008)

Most wins
 2 – Crafty Shaw (2002, 2003)

Most wins by a jockey
 5 – Mike Manganello (1966, 1967, 1968, 1969, 1971)

Most wins by a trainer
 3 – Thomas H. Stevens (1967, 1969, 1978)
 3 – William I. Mott (1996, 1998, 2007)

Most wins by an owner
 2 – William R. Coe (1920, 1933)
 2 – Charles J. Cella (2002, 2003)

Winners

References

External links
 The 2009 Turfway Park Fall Championship Stakes at the NTRA

Discontinued horse races in the United States
Graded stakes races in the United States
Open middle distance horse races
Turfway Park horse races
Recurring sporting events established in 1919
1919 establishments in Kentucky
Horse races in Kentucky